Cheshmeh Kabud (also Romanized as Cheshmeh Kabūd) is a village in Razavar Rural District, in the Central District of Kermanshah County, Kermanshah Province, Iran. At the 2006 census, its population was 657, in 148 families.

References 

Populated places in Kermanshah County